David Buchwald is an American politician and attorney who served as a member of the New York State Assembly, representing Assembly District 93, which includes the towns of Bedford, Harrison, Lewisboro, Mount Kisco, New Castle, North Castle, North Salem, Pound Ridge and White Plains. He was first elected on November 6, 2012, when he defeated the incumbent office holder. He ran for Congress in 2020 to replace retiring incumbent Nita Lowey, and lost to attorney Mondaire Jones of Rockland County in the Democratic Primary.

Early life and education 
Buchwald grew up in Larchmont and Mamaroneck, New York. He attended Yale University, where he received a B.S. in physics. He later went on to receive a Master of Public Policy from the John F. Kennedy School of Government and a J.D. from Harvard Law School.

Career 
Before running for New York State Assembly, Buchwald worked at the law firm Paul, Weiss, Rifkind, Wharton & Garrison LLP. He also interned for Congresswoman Nita Lowey.

Buchwald was first elected in 2012 when he unseated Republican incumbent Robert Castelli. He has subsequently won re-election in 2014, 2016, and 2018.

Electoral history

References

External links
 New York State Assembly Member Website
 Congressional Campaign Website
 Assembly Campaign Website

Living people
People from White Plains, New York
Democratic Party members of the New York State Assembly
Harvard Kennedy School alumni
Harvard Law School alumni
21st-century American politicians
Yale College alumni
1978 births